Events in the year 1973 in Japan. It corresponds to Shōwa 48 (昭和48年) in the Japanese calendar.

Incumbents 
Emperor: Hirohito
Prime minister: Kakuei Tanaka (Liberal Democratic)
Chief Cabinet Secretary: Susumu Nikaido
Chief Justice of the Supreme Court: Kazuto Ishida until May 19, Tomokazu Murakami from May 21
President of the House of Representatives: Umekichi Nakamura until May 29, Shigesaburō Maeo
President of the House of Councillors: Kenzō Kōno
Diet sessions: 71st (extraordinary session opened on December 22, 1972, to September 27), 72nd (regular, December 1 to June 3, 1974)

Governors
Aichi Prefecture: Mikine Kuwahara 
Akita Prefecture: Yūjirō Obata 
Aomori Prefecture: Shunkichi Takeuchi 
Chiba Prefecture: Taketo Tomonō 
Ehime Prefecture: Haruki Shiraishi 
Fukui Prefecture: Heidayū Nakagawa 
Fukuoka Prefecture: Hikaru Kamei 
Fukushima Prefecture: Morie Kimura
Gifu Prefecture: Saburō Hirano 
Gunma Prefecture: Konroku Kanda 
Hiroshima Prefecture: Iduo Nagano (until 10 November); Hiroshi Miyazawa (starting 16 December)
Hokkaido: Naohiro Dōgakinai 
Hyogo Prefecture: Tokitada Sakai
Ibaraki Prefecture: Nirō Iwakami 
Ishikawa Prefecture: Yōichi Nakanishi 
Iwate Prefecture: Tadashi Chida 
Kagawa Prefecture: Masanori Kaneko 
Kagoshima Prefecture: Saburō Kanemaru 
Kanagawa Prefecture: Bunwa Tsuda 
Kochi Prefecture: Masumi Mizobuchi 
Kumamoto Prefecture: Issei Sawada 
Kyoto Prefecture: Torazō Ninagawa 
Mie Prefecture: Ryōzō Tagawa 
Miyagi Prefecture: Sōichirō Yamamoto 
Miyazaki Prefecture: Hiroshi Kuroki 
Nagano Prefecture: Gon'ichirō Nishizawa 
Nagasaki Prefecture: Kan'ichi Kubo 
Nara Prefecture: Ryozo Okuda 
Niigata Prefecture: Shiro Watari
Oita Prefecture: Masaru Taki 
Okayama Prefecture: Shiro Nagano 
Okinawa Prefecture: Chōbyō Yara 
Osaka Prefecture: Ryōichi Kuroda 
Saga Prefecture: Sunao Ikeda 
Saitama Prefecture: Yawara Hata 
Shiga Prefecture: Kinichiro Nozaki 
Shiname Prefecture: Seiji Tsunematsu 
Shizuoka Prefecture: Yūtarō Takeyama 
Tochigi Prefecture: Nobuo Yokokawa 
Tokushima Prefecture: Yasunobu Takeichi 
Tokyo: Ryōkichi Minobe 
Tottori Prefecture: Jirō Ishiba (until 22 February); Kōzō Hirabayashi (starting 27 March)
Toyama Prefecture: Kokichi Nakada 
Wakayama Prefecture: Masao Ohashi 
Yamagata Prefecture: Tōkichi Abiko (until 27 September); Seiichirō Itagaki (starting 17 October)
Yamaguchi Prefecture: Masayuki Hashimoto 
Yamanashi Prefecture: Kunio Tanabe

Events 
January 1 – Health care for those over 70 years of age is made free of charge
March 8 – According to Japan Fire and Disaster Management Agency official confirmed report, Yawata General Hospital fire in Kitakyushu, Fukuoka Prefecture, total 13 patients were fatalities.
March 19 – Konami is established.
July 23 – Nidec was founded, as predecessor name was Nippon Densan (Electric Industry) Corporation.
August 17 – Miyama Real Estate, as predecessor of Leopalace founded in Nakano, Tokyo.
October 27 – A retailer CGC Group founded.
November 29 – Fire breaks out in Taiyo department store in Kumamoto City, killing over a hundred.

Births 

January 2 – Michiyo Nakajima, actress, voice actress and former pop singer.
January 11 – Eri Fukatsu, actress
January 16 – Maki Miyamae, pop singer
January 18 – Shinobu Nakayama, singer and former pop singer
January 31 – Shingo Katayama, golfer
February 1 – Makiko Ohmoto, voice actress
February 7 – Mie Sonozaki, voice actress
February 9 – Yoshitomo Tani, former professional baseball player  
February 11 – Haruhi Terada, voice actress
February 28 – Masato Tanaka, professional wrestler
March 6 – Rumi Ochiai, voice actress
March 7 – Eiji Takemoto, voice actor
March 24 – Sakura Tange, voice actress and singer
March 27 – Sayaka Aoki, comedian
April 6 – Rie Miyazawa, actress and singer
April 21 – Katsuyuki Konishi, voice actor
May 8 – Hiromu Arakawa, manga artist
May 16 – Kōsuke Toriumi, voice actor
May 18 – Kaz Hayashi, professional wrestler
May 29 –  Tomoko Kaneda,  voice actress and J-pop singer
June 12 – Mitsuki Saiga, voice actress
June 18 – Yumi Kakazu, voice actress
June 19 – Yuko Nakazawa, singer
June 29 – Kento Masuda, composer and recording artist
June 30 – Hidetada Yamagishi, bodybuilder
July 2 – Makoto Kosaka, former professional baseball player 
July 4 – Gackt, singer-songwriter and actor
July 7 – Natsuki Takaya, manga artist
July 16 – Yoshihiko Hakamada, actor
July 17 
 Takeshi Kaneshiro, Taiwanese/Japanese actor
 Daimaou Kosaka, comedian
August 13 – Ryōko Shinohara, actress
August 31 – Kaori Mizumori, enka singer
September 1 – Rieko Miura, actress and singer
September 9 – Kazuhisa Ishii, baseball player
September 18 – Ami Onuki, singer
October 11 – Daisuke Sakaguchi, voice actor
October 13 – Nanako Matsushima, actress and model
October 14 – Masato Sakai, actor
October 20 – Tomoka Shibasaki, writer
October 22 – Ichiro Suzuki, baseball player
October 26 – Taka Michinoku, professional wrestler
November 6 – Rumi Shishido, voice actress and singer
December 11 – Yūko Obuchi, politician and cabinet minister
December 19 – Takashi Sorimachi, actor and singer
December 25 – Daisuke Miura, professional baseball coach and former pitcher

Deaths 
April 25 – Tanzan Ishibashi,  journalist and politician  (b. 1884)
May 2 – Akiko Seki, soprano (b. 1899)
September 15 – Saburō Matsukata, journalist, businessman and mountaineer (b. 1899)
September 18 – Ken Harada, first Japanese diplomat to the Holy See (b. 1893)
October 7 – Masayuki Mori, actor (b. 1911)
November 7 – Kiyohide Shima, admiral (b. 1890)
November 23 – Sesue Hayakawa, actor (b. 1886)

See also
 1973 in Japanese television
 List of Japanese films of 1973

References

 
Japan
Years of the 20th century in Japan